Hamida Rania Nefsi (born 17 November 1997) is an Algerian swimmer.

She represented Algeria at the 2015 African Games and at the 2019 African Games. At the 2015 African Games she won one gold medal and two bronze medals and at the 2019 African Games she won three silver medals and three bronze medals.

At the 2018 African Swimming Championships held in Algiers, Algeria, she won the bronze medal in the women's 200 metre breaststroke event.

She represented Algeria at the 2022 Mediterranean Games held in Oran, Algeria.

References 

1997 births
Living people
Place of birth missing (living people)
Algerian female swimmers
Swimmers at the 2014 Summer Youth Olympics
African Games medalists in swimming
African Games gold medalists for Algeria
African Games silver medalists for Algeria
African Games bronze medalists for Algeria
Swimmers at the 2015 African Games
Swimmers at the 2019 African Games
Mediterranean Games competitors for Algeria
Swimmers at the 2018 Mediterranean Games
Swimmers at the 2022 Mediterranean Games
Algerian female freestyle swimmers
Female butterfly swimmers
Female breaststroke swimmers
21st-century Algerian women
20th-century Algerian women